Nasibi Tahir Babai (died 1835), born Tahir Skënderasi, was an Albanian Bektashi wali and bejtexhi.

Tahir Babai took the nickname Nasibi (the fortunate one) after it was reported that the door of the tekke of Haji Bektash Veli in Asia Minor opened miraculously of its own accord to allow him to enter. In his late years he settled in Frashër, Kazza of Përmet, back then Ottoman Empire (today's Albania), where he founded the Tekke of Frashër, a Bektashi tekke which played an important role not only the religious point of view as a key Sufi center, but also had a role in the Albanian National Awakening process.
The tekke was built in 1815 and he served there until his death in 1835. He developed the tekke of Frashër and the one in Leskovik as cultural and literature centers. He inspired two other Bektashi raised Albanian writers, Şemseddin Sami and his brother Naim Frashëri, who contributed to forging the Albanian national conscience. Tahir Babai was regarded as one of three spiritual advisers of Ali Pasha Tepelena.

He was buried in a türbe near the tekke he built, and his grave is a pilgrimage destination.

Nasibi Tahir had studied in Iran, traveled around the Middle East in his youth, visiting Iraq and other Arab countries where he got in touch with Oriental literature. However, the work that he created was lost. According to Şemseddin Sami's Ottoman encyclopedia Kamûs-ül Â'lâm, he composed much verse in Albanian, Turkish, and Persian.

See also
Dalip Frashëri

References

18th-century Albanian people
19th-century Albanian people
Albanian Sufis
Albanian-language poets
Turkish-language poets
Persian-language poets
1835 deaths
People from Përmet
Albanian religious leaders
People from Janina vilayet
Divan poets from the Ottoman Empire
Albanian Sufi saints
Bektashi Order
18th-century Albanian poets
19th-century Albanian poets